WordBASIC was a subset of Microsoft QuickBASIC customized for word-processing in Microsoft Word. It was replaced by  Visual Basic for Applications (VBA) when Word 97 was released. Contrarily to VBA, WordBasic was not object-oriented but consisted of a flat list of approximately 900 commands.

Example code
The following code snippets show the difference between WordBasic and VBA with a "Hello, World!" example:

WordBasic:
Sub MAIN
FormatFont .Name = "Arial", .Points = 10
Insert "Hello, World!"
End Sub

VBA:
Public Sub Main()
    With Selection.Font
        .Name = "Arial"
        .Size = 10
    End With
    Selection.TypeText Text:="Hello, World!"
End Sub

References

BASIC programming language family
Microsoft Office
Programming languages created in 1989
Macro programming languages